Soutpansberg Commando was a light infantry regiment of the South African Army. It formed part of the South African Army Infantry Formation as well as the South African Territorial Reserve.

History

Origin
This unit can trace its origins as part of the Waterberg Commando to just before the Anglo Boer War as the Transvaal Republic became more nervous of its British adversaries in Bechaunaland and Rhodesia.

Operations

With the Zuid Afrikaanse Republiek
The Waterberg Commando gathered at Nylstroom on 11 October 1899. After receiving news of the outbreak of war, this Commando proceeded to the confluence of the Limpopo and Palala rivers to join with the Soutpansberg Commando, cross into Bechaunaland and destroy railway infrastructure.

With the UDF
By 1902 all Commando remnants were under British military control and disarmed.

By 1912, however previous Commando members could join shooting associations.

By 1940, such commandos were under control of the National Reserve of Volunteers.

These commandos were formally reactivated by 1948.

With the SADF
Soutpansberg Commando fell under the localised Command of Far North Command initially, but with the development of the Soutpansberg Military Area, was eventually transferred to that Command structure.

With the SANDF

Disbandment
This unit, along with all other Commando units was disbanded after a decision by South African President Thabo Mbeki to disband all Commando Units. The Commando system was phased out between 2003 and 2008 "because of the role it played in the apartheid era", according to the Minister of Safety and Security Charles Nqakula.

Unit Insignia

Leadership

References

See also 
 South African Commando System

Infantry regiments of South Africa
South African Commando Units